Dumb Dumb may refer to:

 "Dumb Dumb" (Red Velvet song), a 2015 by Red Velvet from the album The Red
 "Dumb Dumb" (Jeon Somi song), a 2021 single by Somi
 "Dumb Dumb", a 2022 single by Mazie from the album the rainbow cassette

See also
 Dum Dum (disambiguation)